Emamzadeh Hashem  may refer to:
 Emamzadeh Hashem, Rasht, Gilan Province
 Emamzadeh Hashem, Amol, Mazandaran Province
 Emamzadeh Hashem Shrine, Damavand, Tehran Province